Besozzo railway station is a railway station in the comune of Besozzo, in the Italian region of Lombardy. It is an intermediate stop on the standard gauge Luino–Milan line of Rete Ferroviaria Italiana.

Services 
 the following services stop at Besozzo:

References

External links 
 
 Besozzo – RFI

Buildings and structures in the Province of Varese
Railway stations in Lombardy